Westridge is a neighbourhood located within the Mitchells Plain urban area of the City of Cape Town in the Western Cape province of South Africa. It is located in the western part of the Mitchells Plain area. The Westridge Gardens, which hosts several indigenous Cape Flats fynbos species, is an important large public park in the area located in the north of Westridge. 

Educational institutions in Westridge include:
Westridge High School
Beacon School for LSEN
Duneside Primary School
Westville Primary School
Ridgeville Primary School
Mitchell's Plain Primary School
Parkhurst Primary School
Harvester Primary School

References 

Suburbs of Cape Town